Peterborough Museum and Art Gallery houses the historical and art collections of the city of Peterborough in Cambridgeshire, England. Managed by Vivacity on behalf of the city council, it is part of the Greater Fens Museum Partnership.

History

The building, originally a private house dating from 1816 (though parts of the cellar date back to a house that was built in the 16th century), was acquired and donated to the Peterborough Natural History, Scientific and Archaeological Society in 1931 by Sir Percy Malcolm Stewart; the art gallery was added in 1939.

The Priestgate mansion had been sold to Earl Fitzwilliam in 1856, who allowed it to be used as a public dispensary and infirmary – the city's first hospital – from 1857 until the opening of the War Memorial Hospital in 1928. In 1968, it was presented to the city by the Peterborough Museum Society.

Since 2010, the museum has been managed on behalf of the city council by Vivacity, an independent not-for-profit organisation with charitable status, which also runs the Key Theatre and the city's libraries.

Collections

Peterborough Museum has a collection of some 227,000 objects, including local archaeology and social history ranging from the products of the Roman pottery industry to a collection of marine fossil remains of international importance from the Jurassic period.

The museum also contains the original manuscripts of John Clare, the "Northamptonshire Peasant Poet" as he was commonly known in his own time and the Norman Cross collection of items made by French prisoners of war. These prisoners were kept at Norman Cross on the outskirts of Peterborough from 1797 to 1814, in what is believed to be the world's first purpose built prisoner-of-war camp.

The art collection contains a variety of paintings, prints and drawings dating from the 17th century to the present day.

See also
Flag Fen

References

External links

Peterborough Civic Society

Houses completed in 1816
Museums established in 1931
Art galleries established in 1939
Buildings and structures in Peterborough
Art museums and galleries in Cambridgeshire
Local museums in Cambridgeshire
Musical instrument museums
1931 establishments in England
City museums in the United Kingdom
Grade II listed buildings in Peterborough
Natural history museums in England